Harry Hiram Wilhelm (born January 14, 1900) was an American football player and coach. He served as the head football coach at Denison University in Granville, Ohio for one season, in 1927, compiling a record of 3–5. Prior to that, Wilhelm served as an assistant coach for the Dayton Triangles of the National Football League (NFL) in 1925.

Head coaching record

College

References

1900 births
Year of death missing
Dayton Triangles coaches
Denison Big Red football coaches
Illinois Fighting Illini football coaches
High school football coaches in Ohio